Capo Zafferano Lighthouse is an active lighthouse located at the extreme tip of the homonymy promontory, under a steep ridge, that marks the eastern entrance to the port of Palermo. The lighthouse is in the municipality of Santa Flavia on the Tyrrhenian Sea.

History
The lighthouse was built in 1884 and when the Marina Militare automated it the keeper's house was abandoned and went entirely in ruin due to negligence and vandalic raids. In 2016 the Agenzia del Demanio, who run the State ownership buildings including the lighthouses, decided to give it in concession with a request for tenders to a private for 50 years. The lighthouse has been given to a restoration firm run by a local chef. It will be transformed into a multipurpose building with a taste store, a restaurant, three suites, and a Museum of the Sea.

Description
The tower and the lantern are white; the lantern dome is grey metallic. The lighthouse is completely automated and managed by the Marina Militare with the identification code number 3244 E.F.

See also
 List of lighthouses in Italy

References

External links

 Servizio Fari Marina Militare

Lighthouses in Italy
Buildings and structures in Sicily